My Enemy's Enemy (Mon Meilleur Ennemi, My best enemy in french) is a documentary film directed by Kevin Macdonald in 2007.

Synopsis
The story of Klaus Barbie through World War II and post-war hiding journey in Bolivia including his involvement in the assassination of Che Guevara before being tried in France for war crimes committed in Lyon and the assassination of Jean Moulin.

Casting
Raymond Aubrac
Robert Badinter
Klaus Barbie
René Hardy
Che Guevara
Beate Klarsfeld
Serge Klarsfeld
Jacques Vergès
Jean Moulin
Kevin Macdonald, narrator

External links
 

2007 films
2007 documentary films
British documentary films
French documentary films
2000s French-language films
Films directed by Kevin Macdonald (director)
Films scored by Alex Heffes
2000s English-language films
2000s British films
2000s French films